The Udzungwa limbless skink (Melanoseps uzungwensis) is an extant species of skink, a lizard in the family Scincidae. The species is found in  Tanzania.

References

Melanoseps
Reptiles described in 1942
Reptiles of Tanzania
Endemic fauna of Tanzania
Taxa named by Arthur Loveridge